Zagroby may refer to the following places:
Zagroby, Łódź Voivodeship (central Poland)
Zagroby, Masovian Voivodeship (east-central Poland)
Zagroby, Podlaskie Voivodeship (north-east Poland)